The Cardiff Sevens was an annual international rugby union sevens tournament that was held at Cardiff Arms Park in Wales from 2001 to 2003 as part of the World Sevens Series. The event was effectively replaced in the series by the Bordeaux Sevens for the 2003–04 season.

Results

References

Former World Rugby Sevens Series tournaments
Rugby union competitions in Wales
Rugby sevens competitions in Europe
Recurring sporting events established in 2001
Recurring sporting events disestablished in 2003